The African ribbontail catshark, Eridacnis sinuans, is a finback catshark of the family Proscylliidae, found in the western Indian Ocean, from Tanzania, South Africa, and Mozambique, at depths between 180 and 480 m. It can grow up to a length of 37 cm.

The African ribbontail catshark is ovoviviparous giving birth to two young per litter.

The African ribbontail catshark's coloration is grey-brown.

References

 

Eridacnis
Ovoviviparous fish
Taxa named by J. L. B. Smith
Fish described in 1957